The 2021 South Alabama Jaguars baseball team represented the University of South Alabama during the 2021 NCAA Division I baseball season. The Jaguars played their home games at Eddie Stanky Field and were led by tenth-year head coach Mark Calvi. They were members of the Sun Belt Conference.

Preseason

Signing Day Recruits

Sun Belt Conference Coaches Poll
The Sun Belt Conference Coaches Poll was released on February 15, 2021 and the Jaguars were picked to finish second in the East Division with 51 votes.

Preseason All-Sun Belt Team & Honors
Aaron Funk (LR, Pitcher)
Jordan Jackson (GASO, Pitcher)
Conor Angel (LA, Pitcher)
Wyatt Divis (UTA, Pitcher)
Lance Johnson (TROY, Pitcher)
Caleb Bartolero (TROY, Catcher)
William Sullivan (TROY, 1st Base)
Luke Drumheller (APP, 2nd Base)
Drew Frederic (TROY, Shortstop)
Cooper Weiss (CCU, 3rd Base)
Ethan Wilson (USA, Outfielder)
Parker Chavers (CCU, Outfielder)
Rigsby Mosley (TROY, Outfielder)
Eilan Merejo (GSU, Designated Hitter)
Andrew Beesly (ULM, Utility)

Personnel

Roster

Coaching staff

Schedule and results

Gainesville Regional

Posteason

Conference Accolades 
Player of the Year: Mason McWhorter – GASO
Pitcher of the Year: Hayden Arnold – LR
Freshman of the Year: Garrett Gainous – TROY
Newcomer of the Year: Drake Osborn – LA
Coach of the Year: Mark Calvi – USA

All Conference First Team
Connor Cooke (LA)
Hayden Arnold (LR)
Carlos Tavera (UTA)
Nick Jones (GASO)
Drake Osborn (LA)
Robbie Young (APP)
Luke Drumheller (APP)
Drew Frederic (TROY)
Ben Klutts (ARST)
Mason McWhorter (GASO)
Logan Cerny (TROY)
Ethan Wilson (USA)
Cameron Jones (GSU)
Ben Fitzgerald (LA)

All Conference Second Team
JoJo Booker (USA)
Tyler Tuthill (APP)
Jeremy Lee (USA)
Aaron Barkley (LR)
BT Riopelle (CCU)
Dylan Paul (UTA)
Travis Washburn (ULM)
Eric Brown (CCU)
Grant Schulz (ULM)
Tyler Duncan (ARST)
Parker Chavers (CCU)
Josh Smith (GSU)
Andrew Miller (UTA)
Noah Ledford (GASO)

References:

References

South Alabama
 South Alabama Jaguars baseball seasons
South Alabama Jaguars baseball
South Alabama